Editions Musica Ferrum is a music publishing company. Focussing on contemporary music, it has published over 80 scores, ranging from concert hall music for full orchestra to educational music  for piano solo. Several award winning composers have their music published by EMF. A possibly unique characteristic feature is the fact that the founder and director of this publishing house, Nikolas Sideris, is himself an award-winning composer "Artiste en Herbs, 2013, Luxembourg", where his "Piano Stories" won the first prize. His  illustrated Fairyland in Treble, is among the best-selling of the publications. 

This publishing house describes itself as trying to make contemporary music accessible. This has been acknowledged when it received the 2014 Gina Bachauer Prize for publishing houses.

One of the means to make contemporary music more accessible is by combining multiple art forms. Nine new illustrations have been produced to inspire nine composers from all over the world in the  Kickstarter-funded project: Beauty and Hope in the 21st Century. Similarly, educational scores are made more attractive by the addition of illustrations, adding an engaging interplay between the story of the drawing, and that of the music. Likewise piano music and poetry has been combined in All Beautiful & Splendid Things: 12+1 Piano Songs on Texts by Women and in Rendezvous with Midnight: 12+1 Nocturnes for Teens by Barbara Arens.

Editions Musica Ferrum wants to publish "music that is beautiful, engraved in handsome scores that are worth owning".

References

External links 
Home - Editions Musica Ferrum

Sheet music publishing companies
British companies established in 2012
Music companies of the United Kingdom